Telire is a district of the Talamanca canton, in the Limón province of Costa Rica.

History 
Telire was created on 14 April 2004 by Decreto Ejecutivo 31772-G.

Geography 
Telire has an area of  km² and an elevation of  metres.

Locations
Poblados: Alto Cuen (Kjacka Bata), Alto Lari (Duriñak), Alto Urén, Arenal, Bajo Blei, Bajo Cuen, Boca Urén, Bris, Cachabli, Coroma, Croriña, China Kichá, Dururpe, Guachalaba, Katsi, Kichuguecha, Kivut, Mojoncito, Namuwakir, Orochico, Ourut, Purisquí, Purita, Rangalle, San José Cabecar, Sepeque, Shewab, Sipurio, Soky, Sorókicha, Sukut, Surayo, Suiri, Telire, Turubokicha, Urén.

Demographics 

For the 2011 census, Telire had a population of  inhabitants.

References 

Districts of Limón Province
Populated places in Limón Province